This is a list of villages in the Bhiwani district of the Indian state of Haryana sorted by tehsil. Population data is from the 2011 Census of India.

Bawani Khera tehsil

Bhiwani tehsil

Loharu tehsil

Siwani tehsil

Budhshelli

Tosham tehsil

See also 
 List of villages in Charkhi Dadri district

References

Bhiwani
 
Bhiwani villages
Villages in Bhiwani
Lists of villages in Haryana